Saera may refer to:

 Saera Khan (born 1979), a Bangladeshi-Norwegian politician
 Saera (wasp), a wasp genus in the subfamily Encyrtinae